John Means may refer to:

 John Means (comedian), stand-up comedian
 John Means (businessman) (1829–1910), mayor of Ashland, Kentucky
 John Barkley Means (born 1939), American professor
 John Hugh Means (1812–1862), governor of South Carolina
 John Means (baseball) (born 1993), American baseball pitcher